Mitchell Josef Santner (born 5 February 1992) is a New Zealand international cricketer who plays all forms of the game. Domestically, he plays for Northern Districts cricket team. He is a bowling all-rounder who bats left-handed, and bowls slow left-arm orthodox spin. He has been involved in the highest 7th wicket partnership for New Zealand in Tests.

Santner was elevated towards the New Zealand team after a promising 2014–15 domestic season. He was named in the one-day squad for the tour of England following the retirement of Daniel Vettori after the 2015 World Cup as New Zealand searched for another left-arm spin option. Santner was then drafted into the touring squad at the start of the England tour to cover for the absence of the players at the Indian Premier League and made an immediate impression with a well-crafted 94 against Somerset. He was handed his One Day International debut at Edgbaston having played just 19 List A matches for Northern Districts.

In November 2020, Santner captained New Zealand for the first time in an international fixture, leading the team in the third Twenty20 International (T20I) match against the West Indies. He did so again in the first T20I match against Pakistan.

Career 
In April 2015, Santner was named in the New Zealand limited-overs squad for the tour of England. He made his One Day International debut for New Zealand on 9 June 2015. His first international wicket was when he trapped fellow debutant Sam Billings for 3. During the fourth ODI in the same series he hit 28 runs off Adil Rashid in one over, which is the second highest runs off one over ever posted in England. He made his Twenty20 International debut in the same series on 23 June 2015.

On 27 November 2015, Santner debuted in his first Test match against Australia. That match was also the first day/night Test. He also became the first player in history to make his test debut in a Day Night Test Match, where he made his debut against Australia. He hit a boundary off the first ball of his Test career.

2016 World Twenty20
Santner was picked to the New Zealand squad as a premier spin bowler along with Nathan McCullum, who was playing his last international tour. In the first match against host India, Santner won man of the match award for his brilliant bowling performances, which lead his side to win by 47 runs. His bowling performance of 4 for 11 is the best bowling figures by a New Zealand spinner in World Twenty20 as well. He was named in the 'Team of the Tournament' for the 2016 T20 World Cup by the ICC, Cricinfo and Cricbuzz.

South Africa in 2017 
Santner and Jeetan Patel became the first pair of spinners to open the bowling in an ODI in the 4th ODI.

2018 
On 16 January 2018. Santner bowled Pakistani cricketer Fakhar Zaman with a carrom ball, something he had been working on for some time, but only recently brought into his international repertoire.

In March 2018, Santner was out of the Test series against England, after suffering a knee injury, ruling him out of action for six to nine months. The injury meant Santner's planned spell in English county cricket with Derbyshire and Indian Premier League during 2018 had to be cancelled.

In May 2018, he was one of twenty players to be awarded a new contract for the 2018–19 season by New Zealand Cricket.

2019–present
Santner made the international comeback against Sri Lanka on 11 January 2019 in the only T20I between the sides before going on to play in four of the five ODIs against India as well as all three T20Is and then two of the three ODIs against Bangladesh later during the same summer. In April 2019, he was named in New Zealand's squad for the 2019 Cricket World Cup.

Santner was bought by Chennai Super Kings in 2018 for INR 50 Lakhs but he didn't play that season due to injury. He was retained by the team the next year (2019) and subsequently made his IPL debut that year. Playing for Chennai Super Kings he hit a 6 from the last ball of the match to defeat the Rajasthan Royals

In November 2019,  while playing against England at Bay Oval, Santner scored his maiden test century. His 261-run partnership with BJ Watling became the highest ever 7th wicket partnership for New Zealand in test cricket. He also took 3 wickets in 2nd innings and became the first New Zealand spinner to take wicket on home soil since March 2018 with 101 consecutive Test wickets in 11 innings in between having all fallen to seamers.

In August 2021, Santner was named in New Zealand's squad for the 2021 ICC Men's T20 World Cup. In February 2022, he was bought by the Chennai Super Kings in the auction for the 2022 Indian Premier League tournament.

References

External links
 

1992 births
Living people
New Zealand cricketers
New Zealand Test cricketers
New Zealand One Day International cricketers
New Zealand Twenty20 International cricketers
Northern Districts cricketers
Worcestershire cricketers
Chennai Super Kings cricketers
Cricketers at the 2019 Cricket World Cup